In linguistics, syntax is the study of how words and morphemes combine to form larger units such as phrases and sentences. Central concerns of syntax include word order, grammatical relations, hierarchical sentence structure (constituency), agreement, the nature of crosslinguistic variation, and the relationship between form and meaning (semantics). There are numerous approaches to syntax that differ in their central assumptions and goals.

Etymology 
The word syntax comes from Ancient Greek roots:  "coordination", which consists of  syn, "together", and  táxis, "ordering".

Topics
The field of syntax contains a number of various topics that a syntactic theory is often designed to handle. The relation between the topics is treated differently in different theories, and some of them may not be considered to be distinct but instead to be derived from one another (i.e. word order can be seen as the result of movement rules derived from grammatical relations).

Sequencing of subject, verb, and object
One basic description of a language's syntax is the sequence in which the subject (S), verb (V), and object (O) usually appear in sentences. Over 85% of languages usually place the subject first, either in the sequence SVO or the sequence SOV. The other possible sequences are VSO, VOS, OVS, and OSV, the last three of which are rare. In most generative theories of syntax, the surface differences arise from a more complex clausal phrase structure, and each order may be compatible with multiple derivations. However, word order can also reflect the semantics or function of the ordered elements.

Grammatical relations
Another description of a language considers the set of possible grammatical relations in a language or in general and how they behave in relation to one another in the morphosyntactic alignment of the language. The description of grammatical relations can also reflect transitivity, passivization, and head-dependent-marking or other agreement. Languages have different criteria for grammatical relations. For example, subjecthood criteria may have implications for how the subject is referred to from a relative clause or coreferential with an element in an infinite clause.

Constituency
Constituency is the feature of being a constituent and how words can work together to form a constituent (or phrase). Constituents are often moved as units, and the constituent can be the domain of agreement. Some languages allow discontinuous phrases in which words belonging to the same constituent are not immediately adjacent but are broken up by other constituents. Constituents may be recursive, as they may consist of other constituents, potentially of the same type.

Early history 
The Aṣṭādhyāyī of Pāṇini, from c. 4th century BC in Ancient India, is often cited as an example of a premodern work that approaches the sophistication of a modern syntactic theory since works on grammar had been written long before modern syntax came about. In the West, the school of thought that came to be known as "traditional grammar" began with the work of Dionysius Thrax.

However, in the 19th century, with the development of historical-comparative linguistics, linguists began to realize the sheer diversity of human language and to question fundamental assumptions about the relationship between language and logic. It became apparent that there was no such thing as the most natural way to express a thought and so logic could no longer be relied upon as a basis for studying the structure of language.

The Port-Royal grammar modeled the study of syntax upon that of logic. (Indeed, large parts of Port-Royal Logic were copied or adapted from the Grammaire générale.) Syntactic categories were identified with logical ones, and all sentences were analyzed in terms of "subject – copula – predicate". Initially, that view was adopted even by the early comparative linguists such as Franz Bopp.

The central role of syntax within theoretical linguistics became clear only in the 20th century, which could reasonably be called the "century of syntactic theory" as far as linguistics is concerned. (For a detailed and critical survey of the history of syntax in the last two centuries, see the monumental work by Giorgio Graffi (2001).)

Theories 

There are a number of theoretical approaches to the discipline of syntax. One school of thought, founded in the works of Derek Bickerton, sees syntax as a branch of biology, since it conceives of syntax as the study of linguistic knowledge as embodied in the human mind. Other linguists (e.g., Gerald Gazdar) take a more Platonistic view since they regard syntax to be the study of an abstract formal system. Yet others (e.g., Joseph Greenberg) consider syntax a taxonomical device to reach broad generalizations across languages.

Syntacticians have attempted to explain the causes of word-order variation within individual languages and cross-linguistically. Much of such work has been done within the framework of generative grammar, which holds that syntax depends on a genetic endowment common to the human species. In that framework and in others, linguistic typology and universals have been primary explicanda.

Alternative explanations, such as those by functional linguists, have been sought in language processing. It is suggested that the brain finds it easier to parse syntactic patterns that are either right- or left-branching but not mixed. The most-widely held approach is the performance–grammar correspondence hypothesis by John A. Hawkins, who suggests that language is a non-innate adaptation to innate cognitive mechanisms. Cross-linguistic tendencies are considered as being based on language users' preference for grammars that are organized efficiently and on their avoidance of word orderings that cause processing difficulty. Some languages, however, exhibit regular inefficient patterning such as the VO languages Chinese, with the adpositional phrase before the verb, and Finnish, which has postpositions, but there are few other profoundly exceptional languages. More recently, it is suggested that the left- versus right-branching patterns are cross-linguistically related only to the place of role-marking connectives (adpositions and subordinators), which links the phenomena with the semantic mapping of sentences.

Theoretical syntactic models

Dependency grammar 

Dependency grammar is an approach to sentence structure in which syntactic units are arranged according to the dependency relation, as opposed to the constituency relation of phrase structure grammars. Dependencies are directed links between words. The (finite) verb is seen as the root of all clause structure and all the other words in the clause are either directly or indirectly dependent on the root. Some prominent dependency-based theories of syntax are the following:

 Recursive categorical syntax, or algebraic syntax
 Functional generative description
 Meaning–text theory
 Operator grammar
 Word grammar

Lucien Tesnière (1893–1954) is widely seen as the father of modern dependency-based theories of syntax and grammar. He argued vehemently against the binary division of the clause into subject and predicate that is associated with the grammars of his day (S → NP VP) and remains at the core of most phrase structure grammars. In the place of that division, he positioned the verb as the root of all clause structure.

Categorial grammar 

Categorial grammar is an approach in which constituents combine as function and argument, according to combinatory possibilities specified in their syntactic categories. For example, other approaches might posit a rule that combines a noun phrase (NP) and a verb phrase (VP), but CG would posit a syntactic category NP and another NP\S, read as "a category that searches to the left (indicated by \) for an NP (the element on the left) and outputs a sentence (the element on the right)." Thus, the syntactic category for an intransitive verb is a complex formula representing the fact that the verb acts as a function word requiring an NP as an input and produces a sentence level structure as an output. The complex category is notated as (NP\S) instead of V. The category of transitive verb is defined as an element that requires two NPs (its subject and its direct object) to form a sentence. That is notated as (NP/(NP\S)), which means, "A category that searches to the right (indicated by /) for an NP (the object) and generates a function (equivalent to the VP) which is (NP\S), which in turn represents a function that searches to the left for an NP and produces a sentence."

Tree-adjoining grammar is a categorial grammar that adds in partial tree structures to the categories.

Stochastic/probabilistic grammars/network theories 
Theoretical approaches to syntax that are based upon probability theory are known as stochastic grammars. One common implementation of such an approach makes use of a neural network or connectionism.

Functional grammars 

Functionalist models of grammar study the form–function interaction by performing a structural and a functional analysis.

 Functional discourse grammar (Dik)
 Prague linguistic circle
 Role and reference grammar (RRG)
 Systemic functional grammar

Generative syntax 
Generative syntax is the study of syntax within the overarching framework of generative grammar. Generative theories of syntax typically propose analyses of grammatical patterns using formal tools such as phrase structure grammars augmented with additional operations such as syntactic movement. Their goal in analyzing a particular language is to specify rules which generate all and only the expressions which are well-formed in that language. In doing so, they seek to identify innate domain-specific principles of linguistic cognition, in line with the wider goals of the generative enterprise. Generative syntax is among the approaches that adopt the principle of the autonomy of syntax by assuming that meaning and communicative intent is determined by the syntax, rather than the other way around. 

Generative syntax was proposed in the late 1950s by Noam Chomsky, building on earlier work by Zellig Harris, Louis Hjelmslev, and others. Since then, numerous theories have been proposed under its umbrella:

 Transformational grammar (TG) (Original theory of generative syntax laid out by Chomsky in Syntactic Structures in 1957)
 Government and binding theory (GB) (revised theory in the tradition of TG developed mainly by Chomsky in the 1970s and 1980s)
 Minimalist program (MP) (a reworking of the theory out of the GB framework published by Chomsky in 1995)

Other theories that find their origin in the generative paradigm are:
 Arc pair grammar
 Generalized phrase structure grammar (GPSG)
 Generative semantics
 Head-driven phrase structure grammar (HPSG)
 Lexical functional grammar (LFG)
 Nanosyntax
 Relational grammar (RG)
 Harmonic grammar (HG)

Cognitive and usage-based grammars 

The Cognitive Linguistics framework stems from generative grammar but adheres to evolutionary, rather than Chomskyan, linguistics. Cognitive models often recognise the generative assumption that the object belongs to the verb phrase. Cognitive frameworks include the following:

 Cognitive grammar
 Construction grammar (CxG)
 Emergent grammar

See also 
 Cartographic syntax
 List of syntactic phenomena
 Metasyntax
 Musical syntax
 Semiotics
 Syntactic category
 Syntax (academic journal)
 Syntax (programming languages)
 Syntax–Semantics Interface
 Usage

Syntactic terms 

 Adjective
 Adjective phrase
 Adjunct
 Adpositional phrase
 Adverb
 Anaphora
 Answer ellipsis
 Antecedent
 Antecedent-contained deletion
 Appositive
 Argument
 Article
 Aspect
 Attributive adjective and predicative adjective
 Auxiliary verb
 Binding
 Branching
 c-command
 Case
 Category
 Catena
 Clause
 Closed class word
 Comparative
 Complement
 Compound noun and adjective
 Conjugation
 Conjunction
 Constituent
 Coordination
 Coreference
 Crossover
 Dangling modifier
 Declension
 Dependency grammar
 Dependent marking
 Determiner
 Discontinuity
 Do-support
 Dual (form for two)
 Ellipsis
 Endocentric
 Exceptional case-marking
 Expletive
 Extraposition
 Finite verb
 Function word
 Gapping
 Gender
 Gerund
 Government
 Head
 Head marking
 Infinitive
 Inverse copular construction
 Inversion
 Lexical item
 Logical form (linguistics)
 m-command
 Measure word (classifier)
 Merge
 Modal particle
 Modal verb
 Modifier
 Mood
 Movement
 Movement paradox
 Nanosyntax
 Negative inversion
 Non-configurational language
 Non-finite verb
 Noun
 Noun ellipsis
 Noun phrase
 Number
 Object
 Open class word
 Parasitic gap
 Part of speech
 Particle
 Periphrasis
 Person
 Personal pronoun
 Pied-piping
 Phrasal verb
 Phrase
 Phrase structure grammar
 Plural
 Predicate
 Predicative expression
 Preposition and postposition
 Pronoun
 Pseudogapping
 Raising
 Grammatical relation
 Restrictiveness
 Right node raising
 Sandhi
 Scrambling
 Selection
 Sentence
 Separable verb
 Shifting
 Singular
 Sluicing
 Small clause
 Stripping
 Subcategorization
 Subject
 Subject-auxiliary inversion
 Subject-verb inversion
 Subordination
 Superlative
 Tense
 Topicalization
 Tough movement
 Uninflected word
 V2 word order
 Valency
 Verb
 Verb phrase
 Verb phrase ellipsis
 Voice
 Wh-movement
 Word order
 X-bar theory

References

Citations

Sources 

 
 
 
 
  An interdisciplinary essay on the interplay between logic and linguistics on syntactic theories.

Further reading 

  5 Volumes; 77 case studies of syntactic phenomena.
 
  Attempts to be a theory-neutral introduction. The companion  surveys the major theories. Jointly reviewed in 
  
  part II: Computational approaches to syntax.

External links 

 The syntax of natural language: An online introduction using the Trees programBeatrice Santorini & Anthony Kroch, University of Pennsylvania, 2007

 
 
Grammar
Language
Branches of linguistics
Philosophy of language
Semiotics
+